Australia at the 2006 Commonwealth Games was represented by Australian Commonwealth Games Association the (ACGA), and abbreviated AUS. Athletes from Australia were given automatic qualification in all sports due to the host status.

Australia first competed at the then-titled British Empire Games in 1930, and is one of only six countries to have sent athletes to every Commonwealth Games.

Australia entered the Melbourne Games as a strong favourite to win the medal tally after having won 207 medals at the 2002 Commonwealth Games in Manchester compared to England's 165 and Canada's 116. Its strongest sports are swimming and cycling.

At the 2006 Commonwealth Games, Australia was at the top of the medal tally with 221 medals: 84 Gold, 69 Silver and 68 Bronze. 
Jane Saville bore Australia's flag at the opening ceremony, while Leisel Jones bore the flag during the closing ceremony.

Medallists

| width="78%" align="left" valign="top" |

* – Indicates the athlete competed in preliminaries but not the final relay.

| width="22%" align="left" valign="top" |

Athletics

Men
Track

Field

Decathlon

Women
Track

Field

Heptathlon

Badminton

Men's

Women's

Mixed

Basketball

Men's tournament

 
 
 

 

|}
| valign="top"|
 Head coach
 
 Assistant coaches
 
 
 

Legend
 (C) Team captain
 Club field describes club at the time of the competition
|}
Group play

Semifinal

Gold medal match

Women's tournament

|}
| valign="top"|
 Head coach
 
 Assistant coaches
 
 

Legend
 (C) Team captain
 Club field describes club at the time of the competition
|}
Group play

Semifinal

Gold medal match

Boxing

Cycling

Road

Men

Women

Track
Team sprint

Sprint

Pursuit

Keirin

Time trial

Points race

Scratch race

Mountain bike

Diving

Men

Women

Field hockey

Men's tournament

Jamie Dwyer
Liam de Young
Michael McCann
Robert Hammond
Nathan Eglington
Mark Knowles
Luke Doerner
Grant Schubert
Bevan George
Stephen Lambert
Aaron Hopkins
Matthew Wells
Travis Brooks
Brent Livermore
Dean Butler
Stephen Mowlam

Group play

 

Semifinal

Gold medal match

Women's tournament

Toni Cronk
Suzie Faulkner
Karen Smith
Kim Walker
Rebecca Sanders
Kate Hollywood
Emily Halliday
Madonna Blyth
Wendy Beattie
Nicole Arrold
Kobie McGurk
Rachel Imison
Angie Skirving
Melanie Twitt
Sarah Taylor
Nikki Hudson

Group play

Semifinal

Gold medal match

Gymnastics

Artistic

Men
Team

Individual finals

Women
Team

Individual finals

Rhythmic

Team

Individual finals

Lawn bowls

Men

Women

Netball

 
 
 
 
 
 
 
 
 
 
 
 

Preliminary round

Semifinal

Gold medal match

Rugby sevens

Preliminary rounds

Quarterfinal

Semifinal

Bronze medal match

Shooting

Men

Women

Open

Squash

Men
Singles

Doubles

Women
Singles

Doubles

Mixed
Doubles

Swimming

Men

Women

Synchronised swimming

 Luda Plotnikova (Vic) – Reserve

Table tennis

Men

Women

Mixed

Triathlon

Weightlifting

Men

Women

Officials
 President: Mr. Sam Coffa AM JP
 Vice President: Mr. Donald Stockins OAM
 Vice President: Mrs. Susan Taylor AM
 Chief Executive Officer / Games General Manager : Mr. Perry Crosswhite AM
 Chef de Mission – Mr John Devitt

See also

 Australia at the 2004 Summer Olympics
 Australia at the 2008 Summer Olympics
 2006 Commonwealth Games#Missing athletes

References

External links
 Australian Commonwealth Games Association

2006
Nations at the 2006 Commonwealth Games
Commonwealth Games